Eastover is a town in Cumberland County, North Carolina, United States. The population was 3,628 at the 2010 census. It was incorporated on July 25, 2007.

History
The Robert Williams House was listed on the National Register of Historic Places in 1983.

Geography
Eastover is located northeast of the center of Cumberland County at  (35.095278, -78.786556).

U.S. Route 301 passes through the center of the town as Dunn Road. Interstate 95 runs parallel to US 301 on the east side of town, with access from Exits 55, 56, and 58. I-95 leads northeast  to the Rocky Mount area and southwest  to Florence, South Carolina. Interstate 295 leaves I-95 at Exit 58 and heads west as a northern bypass of Fayetteville, while the southern terminus of U.S. Route 13 is also at Exit 58, with the highway leading northeast  to Goldsboro.

Demographics

2020 census

As of the 2020 United States census, there were 3,656 people, 1,346 households, and 926 families residing in the town.

2010 census
As of the census of 2010, there were 3,628 people, 1,476 households, and 1,042 families residing in the town. The population density was 320 people per square mile (120.7/km2). There were 1,637 housing units at an average density of 144.5 units/sq mi (55.8/km2). The racial makeup of the CDP was 74.9% White, 19.2% African American, 1.9% Native American, 0.9% Asian, 0.1% Native Hawaiian or Other Pacific Islander, 1.2% some other race, and 1.8% from two or more races. Hispanic or Latino of any race were 3.0% of the population.

There were 1,476 households, out of which 29.9% had children under the age of 18 living with them, 53.4% were headed by married couples living together, 13.3% had a female householder with no husband present, and 29.4% were non-families. 24.7% of all households were made up of individuals, and 10.4% were someone living alone who was 65 years of age or older. The average household size was 2.40, and the average family size was 2.86.

In the CDP the population was spread out, with 21.1% under the age of 18, 6.4% from 18 to 24, 22.7% from 25 to 44, 31.6% from 45 to 64, and 18.4% who were 65 years of age or older. The median age was 44.9 years. For every 100 females, there were 91.9 males. For every 100 females age 18 and over, there were 88.2 males.

For the period 2009–13, the estimated median annual income for a household in the CDP was $42,639, and the median income for a family was $62,461. Male full-time workers had a median income of $41,691 versus $46,128 for females. The per capita income for the CDP was $28,108. About 10.2% of families and 8.8% of the total population were below the poverty line, including 7.3% of those under age 18 and 3.8% of those age 65 or over.

References

External links
Town of Eastover official website

Towns in Cumberland County, North Carolina
Towns in North Carolina
Fayetteville, North Carolina metropolitan area
Populated places established in 2007